FC Swarovski Tirol was an Austrian association football club from 1986 to 1992, based in Innsbruck, Tyrol, Austria.

History
It was created by crystal manufacturer Swarovski as a split-off of FC Wacker Innsbruck, whose Bundesliga license it adopted at the end of the 1985–86 season. With manager Ernst Happel it won the Austrian football championship of 1989 and 1990 as well as the Austrian Cup in 1989. It nevertheless was dissolved in 1992 and the license fell back to FC Wacker, only to change over again to the newly established FC Tirol Innsbruck one year later.

Honours
 Austrian Championship (2): 1988–89, 1989–90
 Austrian Championship Runners-up (1): 1990–91
 Austrian Cup (1): 1988–89
 Austrian Cup Runners-up (2): 1986–87, 1987–88
 Austrian Supercup Runners-up (3): 1987, 1989, 1990

European Cup history
Q = Qualifying QF = Quarterfinal SF = Semifinal

Manager history
  Felix Latzke (1 July 1985 – 30 June 1987)
  Ernst Happel (1 July 1987 – 1 Dec 1991)
  Horst Hrubesch (1 Jan 1992 – 31 May 1992)

External links

 
Association football clubs established in 1986
Association football clubs disestablished in 1986
Defunct football clubs in Austria
Sport in Innsbruck
1986 establishments in Austria
1992 disestablishments in Austria